Batrachorhina rodriguezi is a species of beetle in the family Cerambycidae. It was described by Stephan von Breuning in 1948. It is known from Mauritius and Rodrigues.

References

Batrachorhina
Beetles described in 1948